Laura Bruce (born September 28, 1959) is an American contemporary artist living in Berlin.

Life 
Bruce studied painting at The State University of New Paltz, New York and sculpture at The Slade School of Fine Art in London. She has been visiting professor at the Exeter School of Art, The Slade School of Fine in London, the Berlin-Weissensee Kunsthochschule, and the Hochschule für Bildende Künste Dresden. Bruce has taught at the summer academies in Leipzig, Bremerhaven, Dresden, and at the Summer Workshops at the Neo Rauch Grafikstiftung. She is an art educator at the Otto Hahn School in Berlin.

Laura Bruce is the lead singer in the concept band Dangerpony, who performed live in 2012 for the exhibition opening I Wish This Was A Song at the Norwegian Museum of Contemporary Art in a program including Jan Köchermann & Doppelgenscher, Diamanda Galas, and Killl.

Work 

Her work explores drawing, painting, sculpture, installation, video and performance. Large-scale black and white graphite drawings are an important part of her oeuvre. They are characterized by bold strokes, clear contrasts of black and white, and a distinctive representation of nature as power / phenomenon / myth and the human relationship to it.

Her drawing process of detailed mark making against smooth, large surfaces of complex gray tones. Her drawings have echoes of 19th century European Romantic painting and Hudson River School painting in the U.S. Bruce often works with historical references, which she approaches from a contemporary perspective, for instance in her installation Perpetual, a work of 79 drawings based on Francisco Goya's Los Caprichos, which she showed in full for the first time at Haus am Waldsee Museum in Berlin in 2018.  Or her drawing / sound installation Goodbye is Half the Words You Know (2009-2013), where Bruce presents 10 portraits of classic country singers and reinterprets their songs with her band, Dangerpony. A part of this work was exhibited in 2016 in the exhibition Passion - Fan Behavior and Art (curated by Christoph Tannert) at Künstlerhaus Bethanien, Berlin and the Ludwig Museum, Budapest. It was shown in full in the group exhibition I Wish This Was A Song (curated by Stina Högkvist and Sabrina van der Ley) at the Norwegian Museum of Contemporary Art in 2013.

Public collections 
Bruce' works can be found in the collections of the Neuer Berliner Kunstverein (Artothek and the Video-Forum), the Kupferstichkabinett Berlin, the Berlinische Galerie, the Collection of the City of Mainz and the Vattenfall Foundation, Berlin.

Public commissions 
Laura Bruce's large-format (10 x 6 m) site-specific commission, "De Septentrione ad Astrum" is a permanent mural realized in 2015 in Aschersleben in the Bestehornpark building and officially handed over to the city of Aschersleben.

Awards 
 2012: Losito Kunstpreis
 2010: Grant of the Senate for Cultural Activities, Berlin
 2008: Käthe Dorsch Foundation
 2004: Grant of the Senate for Cultural Activities, Berlin
 2004: Stiftung Kunstfonds, Bonn
 2003: Käthe Dorsch Foundation, Berlin

Exhibitions

Solo exhibitions (selection) 
 2018: To Kiss or Kill, Galerie Rompone, Cologne
 2015: Love and Other Machines, New Art Projects, London, UK
 2015: BRUCE SILL, with Heidi Sill, Kunsthaus Erfurt
 2011: Whippersnapper!!, Fahnemann Projects, Berlin
 2011: Augenweide, Vattenfall Foundation, Berlin
 2010: Holy Rollers, with Hannah Dougherty, The Forgotten Bar, Berlin
 2008: The Hunt, fruehsorge contemporary drawings
 2007: Night Twist, Delikatessenhaus, Leipzig
 2006: Landowners, Galerie Pankow, Berlin
 2005: Big Sky, Galerie Ulrike Buschlinger, Wiesbaden
 2004: The Wide, Büro für Kunst, Dresden

Group exhibitions

Publications

Catalogs 

 2018: Rohkunstbau XXIV: Achtung – Mind the Gap. (Text by Mark Gisbourne)
 2018: Laura Bruce – To Kiss or Kill. (Rompone Gallery, Cologne)
 2018: Laura Bruce – Sounds That Clouds Make. Wasmuth, Berlin 2018, . (Artloft and Alexander Ochs Berlin. Text by Gregory Volk)
 2016: What We Do For Love. (Studio Barbara Krimm. Text by Nicola Kuhn)
 2016: Moment und Dauer. (Parterre Gallery, Berlin. Texts by Kathleen Krenzlin, Jens Semrau and Christian Ulrich)
 2015: Wir kommen auf den Hund. . (Kupferstichkabinett Berlin. Text von Andreas Schalhorn.)
 2015: Passion. Fan Behavior and Art. . (Künstlerhaus Bethanien, Berlin. Text by Christoph Tannert)
 2014: Paperworlds. . (eds. Valeska Hagenay and Sylvia Volz)
 2014: A Line is a Line is a Line. (Pankow Gallery, Berlin. Texts by Anke Paula Böttcher, Anette Tietz, Nanne Meyer)
 2013: ungesehen und unerhört. . (Prinzhorn Collection, Heidelberg. Text by Thomas Röske)
 2013: Die Kunst der Zeichnung. (Kunstverein Essenheim / Altes Rathaus Ingelheim, Text by Andreas Preywisch)
 2012: Drawing Biennale. . (Kunstverein Eislingen, Eislingen. Text by Günther Baumann)
 2012: I Wish This Was A Song. (Nasjonal Museet – Museum of Contemporary Art, Oslo. Text by Sabrina van der Ley)
 2011: Outdoor Excursions. (Burlington City Arts. Text by Gregory Volk)
 2011: Laura Bruce – Whippersnapper!! (Fahnemann Gallery, Berlin. Interview ny Andreas Schalhorn)
 2010: The First Dimension. Birkhäuser, Basel 2010. . (eds. Helmut Germer and Thomas Neeser)
 2010: Laura Bruce: The Castle Drawings. Birkhäuser, Basel 2010, . (Texts by Jutta Mattern, Helmut Germer, Thomas Neeser)
 2009: Was ist dass? (espace artcore / JTM Gallery, Paris)
 2009: The Carnival Within. (Uferhallen, Berlin. Texts by Gregory Volk and Sabine Russ)
 2008: Laura Bruce –The Hunt. . (fruehsorge, Berlin. Text by Gregory Volk)
 2006: Laura Bruce – Landowners. (Pankow Gallery. Text von Christoph Tannert)
 2004: Laura Bruce. . (Texts by Mark Gisbourne and Uta Grundmann)
 2002: Wächsernde Identitäten. (Georg Kolbe Museum, Berlin)
 2002: Thin Skin. . (Independent Curators International, New York)
 2002: Private Affairs. (Kunsthaus Dresden)

Press 

 2017: BOMB Magazine, artist's supplement, Nr. 142
 2007: Drunk on Dreams, FUKT MAGAZINE
 2006: The Animation Issue, FUKT MAGAZINE
 2005: Article: Endlich glücklich sitzen, Frankfurter Allgemeine Zeitung, 22. März
 2004: Article: The hidden beauty of everyday objects we take for granted, Scotland on Sunday, 29. Feb.

Dangerpony 

 2016: KGB Sounds, Heimathafen Berlin
 2014: Podewil, Berlin
 2013: Neuer Berliner Kunstverein, Berlin
 2012: Missklang, West Germany, Berlin
 2012: I Wish This Was A Song, Norwegian Museum of Contemporary Art, Oslo, Norway
 2010: Picture disk vinyl release, West Germany, Berlin
 2009: The Carnival Within, Uferhallen, Berlin

References

External links 

 Official website
Laura Bruce on artitious.com
Portfolio In: bombmagazine.org
Interview mit Laura Bruce In: independent-collectors.com. 03/31/2017.
Dangerpony on SoundCloud

1959 births
20th-century American artists
21st-century American artists
American contemporary artists
American draughtsmen
Living people
Artists from Berlin
People from East Orange, New Jersey